Mokuti Lodge Airport  is an airport serving Mokuti Lodge resort and the Etosha National Park in Namibia.

See also

List of airports in Namibia
Transport in Namibia

References

 Google Earth

External links
 OurAirports - Mokuti Lodge
 OpenStreetMap - Mokuti

Airports in Namibia